The 85th Brigade was a formation of  the British Army. It was originally formed from regular army battalions serving away from home in the British Empire. It was assigned to the 28th Division and served on the Western Front and the Macedonian Front during the First World War. The Brigade was temporarily attached to the 3rd Division between February and April 1915.

Formation
The infantry battalions did not all serve at once, but all were assigned to the brigade during the war.
2nd Battalion, Buffs (East Kent Regiment) 	 
3rd Battalion, Royal Fusiliers
2nd Battalion, East Surrey Regiment 	 
3rd Battalion, Middlesex Regiment
1/8th Battalion, Middlesex Regiment 
85th Machine Gun Company 
85th Trench Mortar Battery
85th SAA Section Ammunition Column

Commanders

References

Infantry brigades of the British Army in World War I